The 2022 NRL season was the 115th season of professional rugby league in Australia and the 25th season run by the National Rugby League.

Teams
The lineup of teams remained unchanged for the 16th consecutive year. This became the second longest stretch of time (after 1947–1966, a span of 20 seasons) of a continuous line-up of teams in competition history (overtaking 15 seasons from 1967–1981).

Pre-season

Pre-season matches were played between 12 February and 28 February 2022, before a 10-day lead up until the beginning of the regular season. It featured nineteen matches across three weekends, including the 2022 All Stars match, which was won by the Māori All Stars 16 – 10, and the annual Charity Shield match between the South Sydney Rabbitohs and St George Illawarra Dragons, which the Dragons won 16–10. The Titans were scheduled to play the Warriors in their second trial match but the match got postponed and then cancelled due to floods in the area.

Regular season
 

 
Bold – Home game
X – Bye
* – Golden point game
Opponent for round listed above margin

Ladder

Ladder progression

Numbers highlighted in green indicate that the team finished the round inside the top eight.
Numbers highlighted in blue indicates the team finished first on the ladder in that round.
Numbers highlighted in red indicates the team finished last place on the ladder in that round.
Underlined numbers indicate that the team had a bye during that round.

Finals series

† Match decided in extra time.

Chart

Grand final

Player statistics and records

The following statistics are as of the conclusion of Round 25.

Top 5 point scorers

Top 5 try scorers

Top 5 goal scorers

Top 5 tacklers

Attendances

Club attendances

Top regular season crowds

Magic Round

Finals

Match Officials
 Includes Finals Matches

2022 transfers

Players
Source:

Loan moves

See also 

 2022 Australian football code crowds
 2021 NRL Women's season (played in early 2022)
 2022 NRL Women's season

References

 
Rugby league in Australia